Sveti Ilija may refer to:

 Sveti Ilija, Varaždin County, a village and a municipality in Croatia
 Sveti Ilija (Serbia), a mountain near Vranje in Serbia
 Sveti Ilija (Pelješac), a mountain peak on the Pelješac peninsula in Croatia
 Sveti Ilija (Biokovo), a peak of the Biokovo mountain in Croatia
 Sveti Ilija (Rilić), a peak of the Rilić mountain in Croatia
 Sveti Ilija, Vranje, a hamlet of a village in Serbia

See also
 Ilija (given name)
 Saint Elias (disambiguation)